UNSC may refer to:

United Nations
United Nations Security Council, the most powerful organ of the United Nations, charged with maintaining peace and security between nations
United Nations Special Commission, an organisation which performed inspections in Iraq (correctly abbreviated UNSCOM)
United Nations Scientific Committee on the Effects of Atomic Radiation (correctly abbreviated UNSCEAR)
United Nations Statistical Commission, oversees the work of the United Nations Statistics Division (UNSD)
United Nations System Staff College, a provider of learning and training for UN staff (correctly abbreviated UNSSC)

Fiction
United Nations Space Command, a fictional organization in the Halo series of games and novels